The 2023 Leinster Senior Cup is the 119th staging of the Leinster Football Association's primary competition. It includes all Leinster based League of Ireland clubs from the Premier Division and First Division, as well as a selection of intermediate level sides. The competition marks the return of the cup since it went on hiatus during the COVID-19 pandemic in Ireland. The competition began on the weekend of 3 September 2022, with a final provisionally set for mid April 2023.

Round 1 

Teams receiving byes: North End United, Kilbarrack United, Suncroft, Gorey Rangers

Round 2

Round 3

Round 4

Quarter final

Semi final
Teams qualified for the semi final;

Bohemians
Bray Wanderers
Usher Celtic

References

2022 in Irish sport
2023 in Irish sport
Association football in Ireland
Leinster Senior Cup (association football)